Roger Phillips may refer to:

 Roger Phillips (Happy Days), a character in TV comedy drama Happy Days
 Roger Phillips (photographer) (1932–2021), plant photographer and botanist
 Roger J. Phillips (1940–2020), American geophysicist and planetary scientist

See also
Roger Phillips Graham (1909–1966), American science fiction writer